Snaith railway station is a railway station that serves the town of Snaith in the East Riding of Yorkshire, England.

History

The station was opened in April 1848 (along with the line) by the Lancashire and Yorkshire Railway, linking the coalfields of West Yorkshire to the busy inland port at Goole.  The station had two platforms and a signal box (to supervise nearby sidings and a level crossing) until 1985, but only one platform here is now in use (and only along part of its length) following the singling of the Gowdall Junction to Goole portion of the route.  The signal box has been demolished and the crossing automated.

Facilities
The station is unmanned, has no permanent buildings or ticketing facilities (so tickets must be purchased in advance or on the train) and minimal amenities - just a single waiting shelter, bicycle rack and timetable poster board.  Step-free access is available from the car park to the platform.

Services
Snaith is served by a limited service of 3 trains per day Monday-Saturday only. The station is not served on Sundays.

References

External links

Railway stations in the East Riding of Yorkshire
DfT Category F2 stations
Former Lancashire and Yorkshire Railway stations
Northern franchise railway stations
Railway stations in Great Britain opened in 1848
Snaith